Linn-Mar High School is a public high school, part of the Linn-Mar Community School District. It serves students in grades 9 through 12 and is located in Marion, Iowa.

History
Linn-Mar High School opened in the fall of 1959. It was built at a cost of $243,325 and housed 177 students when it opened. The school board had a naming contest for the school; a then-eighth grade student won $25 for submitting Linn-Mar, judged the best of 75 entries.

In 2016, Newsweek named Linn-Mar to its list of best high schools for low-income students.

Athletics
LMHS athletic teams are nicknamed the Lions and compete in the Mississippi Valley Conference. A new 6,000-seat athletics stadium opened in 2011, and a new aquatic facility opened in 2013.

Performing arts
Linn-Mar has three competitive show choirs, the mixed-gender "10th Street Edition" and "In Step" as well as the all-female "Hi-Style". 10th Street was undefeated in its 2018 and 2022 competition seasons. The program hosts an annual competition entitled "Supernova". LMHS also has a competitive marching band and hosts an annual competition for that discipline.

The school has twice been awarded the Grammy Signature School award.

Notable alumni
 Jason Bohannon, ProA professional basketball player
Jordan Bohannon, basketball player for the Iowa Hawkeyes
 Lisa Bluder, NCAA women's basketball head coach
 Marcus Paige, National Basketball Association (NBA) guard
 David Parry, National Football League (NFL) defensive tackle
 Kiah Stokes, Women's National Basketball Association (WNBA) center https://en.m.wikipedia.org/wiki/Ray_Cheetany

See also
List of high schools in Iowa

References

External links
Linn-Mar Community School District

Schools in Linn County, Iowa
Educational institutions established in 1959
Public high schools in Iowa
Marion, Iowa
1959 establishments in Iowa